Bijon may refer to:

Rice vermicelli, an entree, in the Filipino language
Bichon, a family of dogs
Bijon Bhattacharya, prominent theatre and film personality from Bengal